"Chick-A-Boom (Don't Ya Jes' Love It)" is a song written by Janice Lee Gwin and Linda Martin and performed by Daddy Dewdrop. It was featured on his 1971 album, Daddy Dewdrop. The lyrics in the verses are spoken, rather than sung.

"Chick-A-Boom" reached number nine on the U.S. Billboard pop chart in 1971.  It also reached number five on the Cash Box Top 100.

It was produced by Dick Monda and Don Sciarrotta. Monda produced music for the 1970-71 Filmation animated television series Groovie Goolies, for which the song was originally written and recorded.

The song makes a reference to Little Richard's "Tutti Frutti".
The single ranked number 34 on Billboards Year-End Hot 100 singles of 1971.

Chart performance

Weekly charts

Year-end charts

Other versions
Jonathan King, under the name 53rd & 3rd featuring The Sound of Shag released a version of the song in the United Kingdom in 1975 that reached #36 on the UK Singles Chart.
Ted Knight released a version of the song on his 1975 comedy album, Hi Guys.

References

External links
 Lyrics of this song

1971 songs
1971 singles
1975 singles
Daddy Dewdrop songs
Jonathan King songs